Major General Ian David Erskine,  (17 March 1898 – 27 July 1973) was a senior British Army officer.

Early life
Erskine was born in London, the son of Alan David Erskine and Enid Rate. He was the grandson of Sir Henry David Erskine and the great-grandson of Francis Seymour, 5th Marquess of Hertford. Erskine was educated at Sandroyd School and Winchester College then the Royal Military College, Sandhurst.

Military career
Erskine commissioned into the Scots Guards on 1 May 1917 and in August was deployed to the Western Front. Erskine was injured in October that year but returned to the front in October 1918. He served as adjutant at the Guards Depot between 1921 and 1923, before serving as regimental adjutant of the Scots Guards until July 1932. In September 1933 Erskine was promoted to major and between 1933 and 1935 undertook training at the Staff College, Camberley.

Between 1935 and 1939, Erskine was Brigade Major, 1st Guards Brigade, and served with the brigade in the Arab revolt in Palestine. Between 1939 and June 1940, Erskine was an instructor and then commandant of the Tactical School Middle East, before becoming commanding officer, 2nd Battalion Scots Guards. Between February and October 1941 he was commander of the 22nd Guards Brigade in Egypt, during which time he was Mentioned in Despatches and awarded the Distinguished Service Order. In 1942 he was Major-General Commanding Troops & Commandant Sudan Defence Force, and he was promoted to acting major general in April that year. From 1943 to 1945 Erskine was Brigade Commander, 148 Pre-OCTU Training Establishments.

From 1945 and 1948, Erskine was Provost Marshal of the Army at the War Office. He retired with the rank of major general in May 1949. He was invested as a Commander of the Order of the British Empire in 1947 and as a Companion of the Order of the Bath in 1949.

Personal life
Erskine married Mariora Beatrice Evelyn Rochfort Alers-Hankey, daughter of Colonel Cecil George Herbert Alers-Hankey and Getrude Clare Fetherstonhaugh, on 1 March 1945.

References

External links

British Army Officers 1939–1945
Generals of World War II

1898 births
1973 deaths
British Army generals of World War II
British Army personnel of World War I
Ian
Commanders of the Order of the British Empire
Companions of the Distinguished Service Order
Companions of the Order of the Bath
Graduates of the Royal Military College, Sandhurst
Graduates of the Staff College, Camberley
People educated at Winchester College
People educated at Sandroyd School
Scots Guards officers
British Army major generals
British military personnel of the 1936–1939 Arab revolt in Palestine
Military personnel from London
British Army brigadiers of World War II